Stephanie Chaves-Jacobsen (born 1980), also known as "Stephany", is a Hong Kong-born Australian actress.

Early life and education
Jacobsen was born in British Hong Kong. Her family moved to Australia when she was twelve years old. 

She is Chinese, Portuguese, Norwegian and English. 

She attended the University of Sydney, from which she graduated with a double-major Bachelor of Arts in English literature and philosophy.

Career
Jacobsen began her career in the SBS comedy series Pizza. She later appeared in the Australian soap opera Home and Away, playing Charlotte Adams from 2001 to 2002, and in the Australian science fiction series Farscape, as well as a number of TV commercials.

In 2007, Jacobsen landed the role of Kendra Shaw in Battlestar Galactica: Razor, a between-seasons television film of the re-imagined Battlestar Galactica television series. She also played Sam Tyler's future girlfriend in the original pilot of the American television show Life on Mars.

In 2008, she was cast on the Fox series Terminator: The Sarah Connor Chronicles, playing Jesse, a Resistance fighter and girlfriend of Derek Reese. She also played Yoshi in The Devil's Tomb.

In April 2009, Jacobsen was cast on The CW's revamped Melrose Place in the role of medical student Lauren Yung.

In 2010, she acted in the science fiction film Quantum Apocalypse. In 2011, Jacobsen made a cameo appearance in the Two and a Half Men episode "People Who Love Peepholes" as Charlie's former girl friend, Penelope.

In 2012, she appeared in the 2012 detective thriller film Alex Cross (as played by Tyler Perry), as the beautiful businesswoman Fan Yau Lee, who becomes the first victim of the antagonist Picasso (Matthew Fox). Loosely based on the novel Cross by James Patterson, the film was the third installment of the Alex Cross film series and a reboot of said series.

Filmography

References

External links

 
 Jackie Brygel, "New Chick on the Block," Courier Mail (Queensland, Australia), 13 September 2001, p. 7.

1980 births
Living people
20th-century Australian actresses
21st-century Australian actresses
Actresses from Sydney
Australian expatriate actresses in the United States
Australian film actresses
Australian people of English descent
Australian people of Chinese descent
Australian people of Norwegian descent
Australian people of Portuguese descent
Australian soap opera actresses
Chinese people of Norwegian descent
Hong Kong people of English descent
Hong Kong people of Portuguese descent
Hong Kong emigrants to Australia
Australian actresses of Asian descent